was a Japanese samurai of the Sengoku period, who served the Imagawa clan. It was planned that he would marry Ii Naomori's daughter Naotora but then he fled to Shinano, to avoid committing suicide caused by slander from an Imagawa retainer. Later he went back to Imagawa, now newly married. Once again he was slandered and was eventually executed by Imagawa Ujizane. It's said that he was killed by a cause of anonymous report of Ono Michiyoshi. His childhood name was Kamenojo (亀之丞).

His son Ii Naomasa was adopted by Naotora, and became a feared general under Tokugawa Ieyasu who is considered one of his Four Guardians.

Family
 Foster father: Ii Naomori
 Father: Ii Naomitsu
 Mother: Sister of Suzuki Shigetoki
 Wife: Okuyama Hiyo (d.1585)
 Concubine: daughter from Shiozawa clan
 Children:
 Ii Yoshinao
 Ii Naomasa by Okuyama Hiyo
 Takasehime married Kawate Yoshinori by daughter from Shiozawa clan

References 

Samurai
1535 births
1563 deaths
Ii clan